North Bend is an unincorporated community in Clinton County, Pennsylvania, United States. North Bend has a post office with ZIP code 17760.

Demographics

References

Unincorporated communities in Clinton County, Pennsylvania
Unincorporated communities in Pennsylvania